Cem Gelinoğlu (born 20 July 1983) is a Turkish actor and screenwriter. He is the creator of the Ali Kundilli series of comedy movies.

Filmography

References 

1983 births
Living people
Turkish male film actors
People from Düzce